Charles Mix County Courthouse, located on Main St. between Fourth and Fifth Sts. in Lake Andes, South Dakota, was built in 1918.   It was listed on the National Register of Historic Places in 1993.

It is a three-story building, the only Prairie School-style courthouse in the state.  It was designed by architect William L. Steele who also was involved in the design of the well-known Woodbury County Courthouse in Iowa.

References

External links

Courthouses on the National Register of Historic Places in South Dakota
Prairie School architecture
Government buildings completed in 1918
Charles Mix County, South Dakota
Courthouses in South Dakota